Algeria Quran may refer to:

 Algeria Quran, Algerian Mus'haf
 Algeria Quran Radio, Algerian radio
 Algeria Quran Television, Algerian television